Folke is a Swedish male given name, which means "chief", derived from the Old Norse folk. As of 2004, in Sweden there are 20,100 persons named Folke. Of them, about 5,700 had it as their main given name. In 2002, 118 newborn boys were named Folke, of them 15 as main name. The name may refer to:

Folke Alnevik (1919–2020), Swedish athlete
Folke Bengtsson (born 1944), Swedish ice hockey player
Folke Bergman (1902–1946), Swedish explorer and archaeologist
Folke Bernadotte (1895–1948), Swedish diplomat
Folke Bohlin (musicologist) (born 1931), Swedish musicologist
Folke Bohlin (sailor) (1903–1972), Swedish sailor
Folke Ekström (1906–2000), Swedish chess player
Folke Eriksson (1925–2008), Swedish water polo player
Folke Filbyter (11th century), Swedish political leader
Folke Fleetwood (1890–1949), Swedish athlete
Folke Frölén (1908–2002), Swedish horse rider
Folke Hauger Johannessen (1913–1997), Norwegian admiral
Folke Herolf (1912–1982), Swedish Army officer
Folke Heybroek (1913–1983), Dutch artist
Folke Hjort (1934–1977), Swedish actor
Folke Högberg (1884–1972), Swedish Army lieutenant general
Folke Jansson (1897–1965), Swedish athlete
Folke Johansson Ängel (died 1277), Swedish archbishop
Folke Johnson (1887–1962), Swedish sailor
Folke Jonsson (1904–1981), Swedish opera singer
Folke Lind (1913–2001), Swedish footballer
Folke Mellvig (1913–1994), Swedish writer
Folke Rabe (1935–2017), Swedish composer
Folke Rehnström (1942–2020), Swedish Army lieutenant general
Folke Rogard (1899–1973), Swedish chess official
Folke Rydén (born 1958), Swedish journalist
Folke Sandström (1892–1962), Swedish horse rider
Folke Skoog (1908–2001), American plant physiologist
Folke Sundquist (1925–2009), Swedish actor
Folke the Fat (11th century), Swedish political leader
Folke Wassén (1918–1969), Swedish sailor
Folke West (born 1948), Finnish filmmaker
Folke Zettervall (1862–1955), Swedish architect

See also
Fulk

References

Danish masculine given names
Norwegian masculine given names
Swedish masculine given names
Finnish masculine given names